Choaspes may be referring to:
 Choaspes River (Iran), modern Karkheh River
 Choaspes River (Afghanistan)
 Choaspes (butterfly), a skipper butterfly genus